Piotr Pawłowski (born 15 June 1959 in Poznań) is a Polish sprint canoer who competed in the late 1970s. He won a bronze medal in the C-2 500 m event at the 1979 ICF Canoe Sprint World Championships in Duisburg.

References

Living people
Polish male canoeists
1959 births
Sportspeople from Poznań
ICF Canoe Sprint World Championships medalists in Canadian